Siegfried Bönighausen (born 20 March 1955) is a retired German football midfielder.

Career

Statistics

References

External links
 

1955 births
Living people
People from Gladbeck
Sportspeople from Münster (region)
German footballers
Bundesliga players
2. Bundesliga players
Rot-Weiss Essen players
Borussia Dortmund players
VfL Bochum players
Association football midfielders
Footballers from North Rhine-Westphalia